Cychropsis wittmeri is a species of ground beetle in the subfamily of Carabinae. It was described by Mandl in 1975.

References

wittmeri
Beetles described in 1975